56 Ceti is a single star located in the equatorial constellation of Cetus. Not found in the original Bayer catalogue, it was given the Bayer-like designation Upsilon1 Ceti by Flamsteed to distinguish it from Bayer's Upsilon Ceti, which Flamsteed designated Upsilon2 or 59 Ceti. In 1801, J. E. Bode included this designation in his Uranographia, but the superscripted designations Upsilon1 and Upsilon2 are not in general use today. 56 Ceti is the Flamsteed designation for this star.

This star is visible to the naked eye as a faint, orange-hued point of light with an apparent visual magnitude of 4.85. It is located about 440 light years from the Sun, based on parallax, and is drifting further away with a radial velocity of +27 km/s. 56 Ceti is an aging giant star with a stellar classification of K3III, having exhausted the supply of hydrogen at its core and expanded to 39 times the Sun's radius. It is radiating 391 times the luminosity of the Sun from its enlarged photosphere at an effective temperature of 4,099 K.

References

Notes 

Ceti, Upsilon2
Cetus (constellation)
Ceti, Upsilon2
Ceti, 56
Durchmusterung objects
011930
009061
0565